Themelo (before 1927: Ταμπάνια - Tampania) is a village and a community in the municipal unit of Fanari in the Preveza regional unit in the region of Epirus, in western Greece.  In 2001 its population was 216 for the village and 302 for the community, which includes the village Dikorfo.

Population

External links
 Themelo GTP Travel Pages

References

Populated places in Preveza (regional unit)